Noski Creek is a stream in Thurston County in the U.S. state of Washington. It is a tributary to Waddell Creek.

A variant name is "Noschka Creek". The creek was named after a pioneer who settled near it in the 1880s.

References

Rivers of Thurston County, Washington
Rivers of Washington (state)